Nikolay Selivesterovich Khlibko (November 28, 1919 – November 17, 1993) was a Soviet and Russian theatre, cinema actor and artistic director.

Biography 

Honored Artist of the RSFSR (1971).

Veteran of Eastern Front (World War II).

Nikolay Khlibko was born on November 28, 1919 in Tashkent.

1938 – 1946 years - student of Leningrad Theatrical Institute of A. Ostrovsky (Saint Petersburg State Theatre Arts Academy nowadays). During his studies at the Institute The Great Patriotic War began. On the 3rd year of his study at the Institute Nikolay Khlibko went to fight as a volunteer in the division of the National Army. Fascist bullet pierced through his right lung, and Nikolay miraculously survived. With the end of the War he returned to the Institute and graduated interrupted studies.

Nikolay received an invitation from Arkady Raikin to work with him, and he worked under his leadership 3 years in Variety Theatre in Leningrad.

1956 – 1958 years - actor of Tashkent Russian Drama Theatre.

1962 – 1990 years - actor of Nizhny Novgorod Drama Theatre.

Nikolay Khlibko was an Artistic Director of the Tashkent Polytechnic Institute.  Exactly Nikolay Khlibko в конце 50-х годов by the theater group returned to the stage play of Mayakovsky "The Bedbug" and "Mystery-Bouffe". Student premiere of "The Bedbug" the entire staff of Tashkent Russian Drama Theatre attended, which immediately took the play to the repertoire with Nikolay Khlibko in a role of Prisipkin, after was "The Bedbug" in Moscow Satire Theatre and in many other theatres of USSR. So, with a creative hand of Nicholay Khlibko "The Bedbug" after years of prohibition and oblivion started a " victory march " on the theatres' stages. In 1957 after 30-year break Nikolay Khlibklo returned to the stage "Mystery-Bouffe". In this play with great praise reacted union magazine "Theatrical Life".

Nikolay Khlibko was an Artistic Director of Gorky Theatre School. 
Students blandly called him "uncle Kolya". Among the students of Nicholay Khlibko such well-known Russian actors as Alexander Pankratov-Chyorny, Igor Ledogorov, Julian Kalisher, Irina Mazurkevich and others.

Most of his life Nikolay Khlibko dedicated to theatre, but also appeared in films.

Nikolay Khlibko died on November 17, 1993 in Nizhny Novgorod because of the heart attack.

Family  

Wife: Aelita Khlibko, Veteran of Eastern Front (World War II), a Lecturer of the German language in the past, 25.08.1925 - 05.02.2015
Sons: Vladimir Khlibko, Sergey Khlibko (Actor)
Grandsons: Elena Khlibko (Actress), Vladislav Khlibko

Theatre works

Filmography

Honors and awards 
 Honored Artist of the RSFSR (1971)
 Medal "For Courage" (Russia)

References

External links 
  Memory Gallery of Nizhny Novgorod Drama Theatre
 Nikolay Khlibko on IMDb
  Students of the theatre about Nikolay Khlibko
 Nikolay Khlibko on KinoPoisk
  All-Russia State Television and Radio Broadcasting Company, Nizhny Novgorod calls Nikolay Khlibko one of the favourite actors of Nizhniy Novgorod public
  Radio program 15 of All-Russia State Television and Radio Broadcasting Company, Nizhny Novgorod from the "Nizhny Novgorod Theater Seasons" radio-series
 Nizhny Novgorod Drama Theatre, 1954 год

Actors from Tashkent
Soviet male film actors
Soviet male stage actors
20th-century Russian male actors
1919 births
1993 deaths
Honored Artists of the RSFSR
Russian State Institute of Performing Arts alumni